The 1987 Kerry Senior Football Championship was the 87th staging of the Kerry Senior Football Championship since its establishment by the Kerry County Board in 1889.

Austin Stacks entered the championship as the defending champions.

The final replay was played on 4 October 1987 at Austin Stack Park in Tralee, between Kenmare and Dr. Crokes, in what was their first ever meeting in the final. Kenmare won the match by 3-10 to 0-18 to claim their second championship title overall and a first title in 13 years.

Results

Final

Championship statistics

Miscellaneous
 Kenmare District win their first title since 1974
 Dr. Crokes quality for the final for the first time since 1914

References

Kerry Senior Football Championship
1987 in Gaelic football